Ultima Thule Peak is a  glaciated mountain summit located in the Saint Elias Mountains of Wrangell-St. Elias National Park and Preserve, in the U.S. state of Alaska. The peak rises above the Hawkins Glacier to its east, Erickson Creek Glacier to the south, and the Canyon Creek Glacier to the northwest. Precipitation runoff from the mountain drains into tributaries of the Chitina River, which in turn is part of the Copper River drainage basin. The first ascent of the then-unnamed peak was made in 1996 by Paul Claus, Ruedi Homberger, and Reto Reuesh via the south face. Paul Claus dubbed the peak “Ultima Thule Peak.” The second ascent was made April 20, 2013, by Kevin Ditzler and Jay Claus via the southwest ridge.

Climate

Based on the Köppen climate classification, Ultima Thule Peak is located in a subarctic climate zone with long, cold, snowy winters, and cool summers. Winds coming off the Gulf of Alaska are forced upwards by the Saint Elias Mountains (orographic lift), causing heavy precipitation in the form of rainfall and snowfall. Temperatures can drop below −20 °C with wind chill factors below −30 °C. The months May through June offer the most favorable weather for viewing and climbing.

See also

List of mountain peaks of Alaska
Geography of Alaska

References

External links
 National Weather Service forecast

Mountains of Alaska
Landforms of Copper River Census Area, Alaska
Wrangell–St. Elias National Park and Preserve
North American 3000 m summits